Hurthala is a village in Shikarpur Tehsil, Bulandshahr district, Uttar Pradesh, India.

Hurthala is located 4 kilometers from Salempur on 14 km at Bulandshahar - Shikarpur road.

Villages in Bulandshahr district